The A5 links the A1 motorway (at the level of Kofinou village) with the A3 near Larnaca. It serves as the main route linking the cities of Limassol (with the biggest seaport on the island) and Larnaca (with the largest airport). It runs parallel to the older B5 Main Road.

See also 
 A1 motorway (Cyprus)
 A2 motorway (Cyprus)
 A4 motorway (Cyprus)
 A6 motorway (Cyprus)
 A7 motorway (Cyprus)
 A9 motorway (Cyprus)
 A22 motorway (Cyprus)

References 

Motorways and roads in Cyprus